The 1916 British Columbia general election was the fourteenth general election for the Province of British Columbia, Canada. It was held to elect members of the Legislative Assembly of British Columbia. The election was called on July 5, 1916, and held on September 14, 1916.  The new legislature met for the first time on March 1, 1917.

The Liberal Party defeated the governing Conservative Party, winning 50% of the vote, almost double its share from the previous election.  The Liberals won 36 of the 47 seats in the legislature.

The Conservatives' popular vote fell from almost 60% to just over 40%, and took nine seats, forming the Official Opposition.

Two other seats were won by independents.

Unlike in the previous BC general election, in 1916 of the 47 MLAs 37 were elected in single member districts. There were also one 4-member district and one 6-member district. Each voter could cast as many votes as there were seats to fill in the district.

Results

Notes:

* Party did not nominate candidates in the previous election.

1 One candidate, H.C. Brewster (Liberal) who contested and was elected in both Alberni and Victoria City, is counted twice.

² Also included as a candidate is R. McBride (Conservative, Richmond) who withdrew before the 14 September polling day but received some overseas votes.

Results by riding

|-
||    
|align="center"|Harlan Carey Brewster 1
|align="center"  |Alberni<small>Liberal
||    
||    
|align="center"  |Cowichan<small>Independent
|align="center"|William Henry Hayward
||    
|-
||    
|align="center"  |Frank Harry Mobley
|align="center"  |Atlin<small>Liberal
||    
||    
|align="center"  |Delta<small>Conservative
|align="center"|Francis James Anderson MacKenzie 
||    
|-
||    
|align="center"|John MacKay Yorston
|align="center" |Cariboo<small>Liberal
||    
||    
|align="center"  |Esquimalt<small>Liberal
|align="center"|Robert Henry Pooley
||    
|-
||    
|align="center"|Edward Dodsley Barrow
|align="center"  |Chilliwhack<small>Liberal
||    
||    
|align="center"  |Fort George<small>Conservative
|align="center"|William Roderick Ross
||    
|-
||    
|align="center"|John Andrew Buckham 
|align="center"  |Columbia<small>Liberal
||    
||    
|align="center"  |LillooetConservative
|align="center"|Archibald McDonald
||    
|-
||    
|align="center"|Hugh Stewart
|align="center"  |Comox<small>Liberal
||    
||    
|align="center"  |NelsonConservative
|align="center"|William Oliver Rose
||    
|-
||    
|align="center"|James Horace King 
|align="center"  |Cranbrook<small>Liberal
||    
||    
|align="center"  |Similkameen<small>Conservative
|align="center"|Lytton Wilmot Shatford
||    
|-
||    
|align="center"|John Oliver
|align="center"  |Dewdney<small>Liberal
||    
||    
|align="center"  |South Okanagan<small>Conservative
|align="center"|James William Jones
||    
|-
||    
|align="center"|Alexander Ingram Fisher
|align="center"  |Fernie<small>Liberal
||    
||    
|align="center"  |Trail<small>Conservative
|align="center"|James Hargrave Schofield
||    
|-
||    
|align="center"|James Edwin Wallace Thompson
|align="center"  |Grand Forks<small>Liberal
||    
||    
|align="center" rowspan=|Vancouver City<small>Conservative
|align="center"|William John Bowser
||    
|-
||    
|align="center"|John Duncan MacLean
|align="center"  |Greenwood<small>Liberal
||    
||    
|align="center"  |Newcastle<small>Independent Socialist
|align="center"|Parker Williams
||    
|-
|-
||    
|align="center"|Malcolm Bruce Jackson
|align="center"  |The Islands<small>Liberal
||    
|-
||    
|align="center"|Frederick William Anderson
|align="center"  |Kamloops<small>Liberal
||    
|-
|-
||    
|align="center"|John Keen
|align="center"  |Kaslo<small>
||    
|-
|-
||    
|align="center"|William Sloan
|align="center"  |Nanaimo<small>Liberal
||    
|-
|-
||    
|align="center"|David Whiteside
|align="center"  |New Westminster<small>Liberal
||    
|-
|-
||    
|align="center"|Kenneth Cattanach MacDonald
|align="center"  |North Okanagan<small>Liberal
||    
|-
|-
||    
|align="center"|George Samuel Hanes
|align="center"  |North Vancouver<small>Liberal
||    
|-
|-
||    
|align="center"|Alexander Malcolm Manson
|align="center"  |Omineca<small>Liberal
||    
|-
|-
||    
|align="center"|Thomas Dufferin Pattullo
|align="center"  |Prince Rupert<small>Liberal
||    
|-
|-
||    
|align="center"|William Henry Sutherland
|align="center"  |Revelstoke<small>Liberal
||    
|-
|-
||    
|align="center"|Gerald Grattan McGeer
|align="center"  |Richmond<small>Liberal
||    
|-
|-
||    
|align="center"|William David Wilson
|align="center"  |Rossland<small>Liberal
||    
|-
|-
||    
|align="center"|Frederick Arthur Pauline
|align="center"  |Saanich<small>Liberal
||    
|-
|-
||    
|align="center"|Charles Franklin Nelson
|align="center"  |Slocan<small>Liberal
||    
|-
|-
||    
|align="center"|John Walter Weart
|align="center"  |South Vancouver<small>Liberal
||    
|-
|-
||    
|align="center"|John Sedgwick Cowper
|align="center" rowspan=5 |Vancouver City<small>Liberal
||    
|-
|-
||    
|align="center"|John Wallace deBeque Farris
||    
|-
|-
||    
|align="center"|Malcolm Archibald Macdonald
||    
|-
|-
||    
|align="center"|John William McIntosh
||    
|-
|-
||    
|align="center"|Ralph Smith
||    
|-
|-
||    
|align="center"|George Bell
|align="center" rowspan=4 |Victoria City<small>Liberal
||    
|-
|-
||    
|align="center"|Harlan Carey Brewster
||    
|-
|-
||    
|align="center"|Henry Charles Hall
||    
|-
|-
||    
|align="center"|John Hart
||    
|-
|-
||    
|align="center"|Joseph Walters
|align="center"  |Yale<small>Liberal
||    
|-
| align="center" colspan="10"|Source: Elections BC
|-
|}

See also
List of British Columbia political parties

Notes

Further reading & references

In the Sea of Sterile Mountains: The Chinese in British Columbia, Joseph Morton, J.J. Douglas, Vancouver (1974).  Despite its title, a fairly thorough account of the politicians and electoral politics in early BC.
 

1916
1916 elections in Canada
1916 in British Columbia
September 1916 events